The sulphury flycatcher (Tyrannopsis sulphurea) is a passerine bird which is a localised resident breeder from  Trinidad, the Guianas and Venezuela south to Amazonian Peru, northern Bolivia and Brazil.

This large tyrant flycatcher is found in savannah habitat with moriche palms. The nest is an open cup of sticks in the crown of a moriche palm, and the typical clutch is two cream-coloured eggs blotched with brown.

The adult sulphury flycatcher is 20.3 cm long and weighs 54g. The head and neck are dark grey, and there is a concealed yellow crown stripe. The upperparts are olive, and the wings and tail are brown. The underparts are yellow with a greenish tint to the upper breast and a white throat. The black bill is short and broad.

This species resembles the tropical kingbird, but is shorter, stockier, and has a shorter bill. The call is a loud squealing jweeez, quite different from the kingbird's twittering.

Sulphury flycatchers wait on an exposed perch high in a palm and sally out to catch insects in flight. They will also take some berries and other fruits.

The species is in its own genus-(monotypic), because of its bird voicebox anatomy, the syrinx.

References

External links
Sulphury Flycatcher photo gallery VIREO
Photo-Medium Res; Article oiseaux

sulphury flycatcher
Birds of the Amazon Basin
Birds of the Guianas
sulphury flycatcher
Birds of Brazil